Alpheias querula is a species of snout moth in the genus Alpheias. It was described by Harrison Gray Dyar Jr. in 1913, and is known from the US state of Texas.

References

Moths described in 1913
Cacotherapiini
Moths of North America